Evelyne Blaton (born 17 September 1961) is a Belgian equestrian. She competed in two events at the 1992 Summer Olympics.

References

External links
 

1961 births
Living people
Belgian female equestrians
Olympic equestrians of Belgium
Equestrians at the 1992 Summer Olympics
Sportspeople from Brussels